Kong Ha is a village in Sha Tau Kok, Hong Kong.

Administration
Kong Ha is a recognized village under the New Territories Small House Policy.

History
At the time of the 1911 census, the population of Kong Ha was 135. The number of males was 63.

The three Hakka villages of Tam Shui Hang, Tong To and Shan Tsui had a total population of around 1,000 persons in
1961. During the Cultural Revolution, the villagers of these three places removed a Tin Hau image from a Man Mo temple located across the border in Mainland China and built a temple at the western end of Kong Ha Village to house the image. The temple was under the management of a special trust, the Sam Wo Tong.

Features
Kong Ha Village has been described as "containing numerous historic village houses that were built before 1950". The Tang
Ancestral Hall is located in Kong Ha Village. Yuen Tuen Shan, a hill adjacent to the village, features a feng shui woodland.

See also
 Frontier Closed Area

References

External links
 Delineation of area of existing village Kong Ha (Sha Tau Kok) for election of resident representative (2019 to 2022)

Villages in North District, Hong Kong
Sha Tau Kok